Cynanchum acutum is a species of climbing vine swallowworts native to Europe, Africa, and Asia.

Taxonomy
Two subspecies are often distinguished:
 Cynanchum acutum subsp. acutum, Europe, Africa, western Asia
 Cynanchum acutum subsp. sibiricum, Asian

References

acutum
Flora of Europe
Flora of Asia
Flora of Africa
Taxa named by Carl Linnaeus